Dyrrachio is a mountain village in the municipal unit of Falaisia, southwestern Arcadia, Greece. Dyrrachio had a population of 299 in 2001. It is 3 km west of Neochori, 4 km east of Akovos, 7 km southwest of Longanikos and 25 km south of Megalopoli. Dyrrachio suffered damage from the 2007 Greek forest fires.

Population

See also
List of settlements in Arcadia
List of traditional settlements of Greece

References

External links
History and Information about Dyrrachio
Dyrrachio on the GTP Travel Pages

Falaisia
Populated places in Arcadia, Peloponnese